Onoff, stylized as ONOFF, are a Rock Trio punk rock band from Dublin, Ireland.

Onoff broke onto the Irish scene in 2002 with the release of their Hey Jack! You're Late! album, which reached number 7 in Irish Tower Chart. By then, Onoff had already played sold-out shows around Ireland prior to release which included shows in the Ambassador Theatre.

Onoff's now-infamous live performances; which included getting fans on stage, fire-breathing finales, and even arriving on stage in coffins, landed them support slots with their own idols such as Fall Out Boy, Bad Religion, Funeral For a Friend and Therapy?, as well as a tour with Reel Big Fish.

2007 saw the band write and record their new album, play two sold-out Irish tours and a European tour with Dutch punk band De Heideroosjes. This year will see the Irish release of the first single from this new album. The band has been booked for a month-long European tour this March which will include some shows with Dropkick Murphys.

October 2008 saw Onoff release 70,000 copies of their debut European album Don't Take Our Word For It which put them on the cover of two major German music magazines, Stardust magazine, and OX Fanzine. The release was supported by eight headline tours of Germany, Netherlands, Belgium, Austria, Switzerland and France, and a summer 2009 European Festival Tour. The album was received unanimously well across the European media with raving reviews right across the board.

In September 2009, Onoff was voted Best Unsigned Band in leading Irish Music Magazine HOTPRESS. The competition was a public vote. Onoff won a headline slot on the LIVE STAGE at the 2009 HOTPRESS MUSIC SHOW at the R.D.S Dublin.

In 2013 the band relocated to America before the release of the video "Got That Feelin'", which was shot in Ireland in Dundalk, County Louth. 
Since moving to Sacramento California, ONOFF has built a strong fan base due to their energetic live shows and constant touring and momentum continues to gather speed. With multiple appearances on prime time TV and extensive airplay on major radio stations.. REBORN was the band's first US album release and in its entirety was written, recorded and mixed in California. "Keep that Fire Burning" is the opening track from the album and was released in April 2017, and was accompanied by a video shot at the bands H.Q featuring fans and friends. "Don't Look Surprised" is another track from the album and was voted fifth most requested song of 2017 on California rock radio station, 98 Rock. "Hayley" was the next release from REBORN and was accompanied by a reel compilation video of 2018/19 tour, covering the band's festival sets at City of Trees, Concerts in the Park and First Fest.

2019 saw Onoff tour the United States' West Coast  from Seattle to San Diego. Bottom of the Hill, Slims and Great America Music Hall, all in San Francisco, Whisky a GO-GO in Hollywood, Ace of Spades and Harlows, both in Sacramento. The band's last headline show of 2019 was at Harlow's, a testament to the rise in support of the band in their adopted home city of Sacramento.

In late 2019, Onoff collaborated with Da Bay Bully Dupree, a hip hop artist from the San Francisco Bay Area and  recorded a track together in Fat Cat Studios in Sacramento. The track is called "Closer" and was set for release in early 2020. The track was showcased live at Concerts in the Park in Downtown Sacramento. For the big festival shows like CIP, the band is accompanied by Brass to Mouth, the band's hired brass section.

2020 will see Onoff break new ground with plans in the pipeline to open up the path to Canada, and also travel down south to Mexico where the band has a large following. This is evident through stats and figures linked to the band's social media platforms and online sales, with Mexico peaking at the top in all those stats.

References

External links

Irish punk rock groups